Neocrepidodera motschulskii is a species of flea beetle from Chrysomelidae family that can be found everywhere in Europe except for Albania, Andorra, Latvia, Liechtenstein, Moldova, Monaco, Romania, San Marino, Spain, Switzerland, Vatican City, Yugoslavian states, and various European islands.

References

Beetles described in 1991
Beetles of Europe
motschulskii